Sinisalo is a Finnish surname. Notable people with the surname include:

Anu Sinisalo, Finnish actress
Ilkka Sinisalo (1958–2017), Finnish ice hockey forward 
Johanna Sinisalo (born 1958), Finnish science fiction and fantasy writer
Jukka Sinisalo (born 1982), Finnish football player 
Taisto Sinisalo (1926–2002), Finnish politician
Tomas Sinisalo (born 1986), American-born Finnish ice hockey forward, son of Ilkka 
Veikko Sinisalo (1926–2003), Finnish actor
Viljami Sinisalo (born 2001), Finnish football player

Finnish-language surnames